Craugastor brocchi is a species of frog in the family Craugastoridae.
It is found in Guatemala and Mexico.
Its natural habitats are subtropical or tropical moist montane forests and rivers.
It is threatened by habitat loss.

References

Sources

brocchi
Amphibians of Guatemala
Amphibians described in 1882
Taxonomy articles created by Polbot